Hato or HATO may refer to:

Places
 Hato International Airport, Willemstad, Curaçao
 Hato, Curaçao, a village and former plantation in Curaçao
 Hato, Santander, a town in Santander Department, Colombia
 Hato, San Lorenzo, Puerto Rico, a barrio in San Lorenzo, Puerto Rico (U.S.)

People with the surname
 Ergilio Hato (1926-2003), football goalkeeper from Curaçao, Netherlands Antilles
 Yasuhiro Hato (born 1976), Japanese footballer

Other uses
 Typhoon Hato
 Highways Agency Traffic Officer, UK

See also